The Diyarbakır bombing may refer to:

2008 Diyarbakır bombing
2015 Diyarbakır rally bombings
2016 Diyarbakır bombing (disambiguation), which could refer to:
February 2016 Diyarbakır bombing
March 2016 Diyarbakır bombing
May 2016 Diyarbakır bombing
November 2016 Diyarbakır bombing
2017 Diyarbakır bombing